Hamelmalo Subregion (Hamel Malo Subregion) is a subregion in the northwestern Anseba region (Zoba Anseba) of Eritrea.

References
Hamel Malo

Anseba Region
Subregions of Eritrea